Gulpur is a town in the Kotli District of Azad Kashmir, Pakistan. It is located at 33°26'5N 73°51'40E. It is located southwest of Kotli city and is located on the junction of the Kotli-Mirpur and Kotli-Rawalpindi road.  Gulpur is a small town providing for the local villages as well as the residents of a large refugee camp.

Near Gulpur is a historical fort called Throachi Fort that is located in the Throachi village. It is 2 kilometres away from the Gulpur town.

References

Populated places in Kotli District